General elections were held in Uruguay on November 26, 1989. They resulted in a clear win for the National Party, and victory for the Herrerismo-Renovación y Victoria presidential candidate, Luis Alberto Lacalle.

This was only the third time in the 20th century that the National Party won a general election. The incumbent Colorado Party was defeated.

Results

References

External links
Politics Data Bank at the Social Sciences School – Universidad de la República (Uruguay)

Uruguay
Elections in Uruguay
General
Uruguay
Luis Alberto Lacalle